Langelille is a village in Weststellingwerf in the province of Friesland, the Netherlands. It had a population of around 220 in 2017.

The village was first mentioned in 1580 as Langelijle. The etymology is unclear.

In 1840, Langelille was home to 170 people. In 1896, a dairy factory was built in the village.

References

External links

Geography of Weststellingwerf
Populated places in Friesland